Mordellaria africana is a species of beetle in the genus Mordellaria of the family Mordellidae. It was described in 1956.

References

Beetles described in 1956
Mordellidae